The following table lists many specialized symbols commonly used in modern mathematics, ordered by their introduction date. Note that the table can also be ordered alphabetically by clicking on the relevant header title.

See also
 History of mathematical notation
 History of the Hindu–Arabic numeral system
 Glossary of mathematical symbols
 List of mathematical symbols by subject
 Mathematical notation
 Mathematical operators and symbols in Unicode

Sources

External links
 RapidTables: Math Symbols List
 Jeff Miller: Earliest Uses of Various Mathematical Symbols

Symbols by introduction date
 
Mathematics timelines